Licheng District is an urban district of Putian on the southeast coast of Fujian Province (Minnan), China.

Geography
Licheng comprises the southern shore of Xinghua Bay on the Taiwan Strait and its hinterland. It forms the southeastern corner of Putian's prefecture, bordering Houhai Lake and Quanzhou, and covers most of the extensively irrigated southern Putian Plain, an area known as the Nanyang.

Administrative divisions
Licheng is composed of the 2 subdistricts of Zhenhai  Zhènhǎi Jiēdào) and Gongchen  Gǒngchén Jiēdào) and the 4 towns of West Tianwei  Xītiānwěi Zhèn), Huangshi, Xindu  Xīndù Zhèn), and Beigao.

References

Citations

Bibliography
 

County-level divisions of Fujian
Putian